Statewide primary elections for various state offices were held in the Commonwealth of Pennsylvania on May 15, 2007. Pennsylvania's general elections were then held statewide on November 6, 2007.

Justice of the Supreme Court

Judge of the Superior Court

Judicial retention

Supreme Court

Superior Court

Commonwealth Court

References

2007 Pennsylvania elections
Pennsylvania